Bishopville is an unincorporated community and census-designated place 10 miles (16 km) north of Berlin in Worcester County, Maryland, United States. The community is just south of the Delaware state line. It is part of the Salisbury, Maryland-Delaware Metropolitan Statistical Area. As of the 2010 census, Bishopville had a population of 531.

Bishopville arose at the site of a mill on and crossing of the Bishopville Prong of the St. Martin's River. The crossing, the main road through the community, is now Maryland Route 367.

Demographics

References

External links

Bishopville-St. Martin's Neck Community Association

Census-designated places in Worcester County, Maryland
Census-designated places in Maryland
Salisbury metropolitan area